Alta California was a province of New Spain.

Alta California may also refer to:

 The Daily Alta California or Alta Californian, a 19th century San Francisco newspaper
 Alta, California, a community in California, US

See also 
 California (disambiguation)
 Alta (disambiguation)
 Alto, California
 Baja California (disambiguation)